Seowon were the most common educational institutions of Korea during the mid- to late Joseon Dynasty. They were private institutions, and combined the functions of a Confucian shrine and a preparatory school. In educational terms, the seowon were primarily occupied with preparing students for the national civil service examinations. In most cases, seowon served only pupils of the aristocratic yangban class. On 6 July 2019, UNESCO recognized a collection of nine seowon as a World Heritage Site.

History

Seowons first appeared in Korea in the early Joseon Dynasty. They were modeled after early private Chinese academies of classical learning shuyuan. The latter originated in the 8th century under the Tang dynasty, and were later dismantled under the Yuan dynasty to become preparatory schools for the imperial examinations under government control. 

Although the exact year of seowons introduction in Korea is not known for certain, in 1418 King Sejong issued rewards to two scholars for their work in setting up seowon in Gimje and Gwangju. The first seowon to receive a royal charter was the Sosu Seowon in Punggi, presided over by Toegye, which was given a hanging board by King Myeongjong in 1550.

Many seowon were established by leading literati, or by local groups of yangban families. For instance, Ju Se-bong established the Sosu Seowon, which continued in operation long after his death. Some of them were built by Sarim scholars who retired to villages in the wake of literati purges of 16th century and served as their political bases.

Most seowon were closed by an edict of the regent Daewon-gun in the turbulent final years of the 19th century. He banned the unauthorized construction of seowon in 1864, and removed their tax exemption in 1868; finally, in 1871, he ordered all but a handful closed. The provincial yangban were outraged by these measures, and this is among the reasons that Daewon-gun was driven from power in 1873; however, the seowon remained closed.

World Heritage Site

Seowon, Korean Neo-Confucian Academies is a World Heritage Site consisting of a selection of nine seowon:

 Sosu Seowon, Yeongju, Gyeongsangbuk-do
 Namgye Seowon, Hamyang County, Gyeongsangnam-do
 Oksan Seowon, Gyeongju, Gyeongsangbuk-do
 Dosan Seowon, Andong, Gyeongsangbuk-do
 Piram Seowon, Jangseong County, Jeollanam-do
 Dodong Seowon, Dalseong County, Daegu Metropolitan City
 Byeongsan Seowon, Andong, Gyeongsangbuk-do
 Museong Seowon, Jeongeup, Jeollabuk-do
 Donam Seowon, Nonsan, Chungcheongnam-do

Notes

References

See also

Education in the Joseon Dynasty
Korean Confucianism
History of Korea
List of seowon
Academies (Shuyuan) (Chinese equivalent to seowon)

External links
Asian Historical Architecture: Byeongsan Seowon (병산서원), a representative example

 
Education in the Joseon dynasty
World Heritage Sites in South Korea